Edvīns is a Latvian masculine given name which may refer to:
Edvīns Bārda (1900–1947), Latvian footballer and manager
Edvīns Bietags (1908–1983),  Latvian wrestler
Edvīns Ķeņģis (born 1959), Latvian chess Grandmaster 
Edvīns Ozolinš (born 1939), Soviet Latvian track and field athlete, coach and Olympic medalist
Edvīns Šnore (born 1974), Latvian film director
Edvīns Zāģeris (born 1943), Latvian hurdler

See also
Edvin

Latvian masculine given names